Djibril Camara (born 22 June 1989) is a French rugby union player. He plays at wing for Bayonne in the Top 14. He is born in France, and is of Senegalese descent.

References

External links
Ligue Nationale De Rugby Profile
European Professional Club Rugby Profile
Stade Français Profile

1989 births
Living people
French rugby union players
Stade Français players
Aviron Bayonnais players
French sportspeople of Senegalese descent
France international rugby union players
Rugby union wings